Pinili, officially the Municipality of Pinili, is a 3rd class municipality in the province of Ilocos Norte, Philippines. According to the 2020 census, it has a population of 17,626 people.

History 
Pinili was once a forested hilly part of the towns of Paoay, Badoc, and Batac. Pinili is both a Tagalog and Ilokano word for 'chosen'.

Then vicar of the Philippine Revolution Gregorio Aglipay and his Sandataan guerrilla chose the then thickly forested hilly area of Pinili to be his and his guerrillas’ last stand against the advancing American troops who are out to subdue President Emilio Aguinaldo and his followers north of the capital Manila. Some are romanticizing that it was Aglipay who selected the name Pinili, but in fact it was the area's elders themselves who chose to unite and be one municipality after the Philippine-American War for unity and closer cooperation.

Pinili was made an independent town on January 20, 1920, after then Governor General Francis Burton Harrison signed on Dec. 20, 1919 his Executive Order No. 92. Felipe Arcangel was appointed by townmate Aglipay as the first town chief executive.

Later on during the Japanese occupation in the 1940s, bolomen from the town, headed by Mariano Gamatero, with three subordinate officers ranked major, Agustin Cabie, Cecilio Vermudez, and Florencio Tacub, fought guerrilla warfare using military tactics including ambushes, sabotage, raids, petty warfare, hit-and-run tactics, and mobility, to fight the larger and less-mobile Japanese troops.

On the first day of 2020, Pinili's history is re-enacted at the town square after a Thanksgiving Mass in Kullabeng, the site where Aglipay used to meet up with elders of the area before it became a town. It was also there where Aglipay, then no longer a Catholic, celebrated what was to be called the first Aglipayan Mass.

Geography

Barangays
Pinili is politically subdivided into 25 barangays. These barangays are headed by elected officials: Barangay Captain, Barangay Council, whose members are called Barangay Councilors. All are elected every three years.

Climate

Demographics

Economy

Government
Pinili, belonging to the second congressional district of the province of Ilocos Norte, is governed by a mayor designated as its local chief executive and by a municipal council as its legislative body in accordance with the Local Government Code. The mayor, vice mayor, and the councilors are elected directly by the people through an election which is being held every three years.

Elected officials

References

External links
[ Philippine Standard Geographic Code]
Philippine Census Information
Local Governance Performance Management System

Municipalities of Ilocos Norte